The Eurovision Young Musicians 2010 was the fifteenth edition of the Eurovision Young Musicians, held at the Rathausplatz in Vienna, Austria on 14 May 2010. Organised by the European Broadcasting Union (EBU) and host broadcaster Österreichischer Rundfunk (ORF), musicians from seven countries participated in the televised final. This was the third time that the competition was held on an open-air stage and was the beginning of the annual Vienna Festival.

A total of fifteen countries took part in the competition therefore a semi-final was held at the ORF Funkhaus Wien studios on 8 and 9 May 2010. All participants performed a classical piece of their choice accompanied by the Vienna Symphony Orchestra, conducted by Cornelius Meister.  made their début while  returned.

Eva Nina Kozmus of Slovenia won the contest, with Norway and Russia placing second and third respectively.

Location

Rathausplatz, a square outside the Wiener Rathaus city hall of Vienna, was the host location for the 2010 edition of the Eurovision Young Musicians final. The ORF Funkhaus Wien studios in Vienna, Austria, hosted the semi-final round.

Format
Christoph Wagner-Trenkwitz was the host of the 2010 contest.

Results

Semi-final 
A total of fifteen countries took part in the semi-final round of the 2010 contest, of which seven qualified to the televised grand final.

Final 
Awards were given to the top three countries. The table below highlights these using gold, silver, and bronze. The placing results of the remaining participants is unknown and never made public by the European Broadcasting Union.

Jury 
The jury members consisted of the following:

Semi-final 

 – Werner Hink
 – Ranko Markovic
 – Aleksandar Markovic
 – Ingela Øien
 – Hüseyin Sermet

Final 

 – Peter Eötvös (head)
 – Werner Hink
 – Cristina Ortiz
 – Ben Pateman
 – Alexei Ogrintchouk

Broadcasting
The competition was transmitted live over the Eurovision Network, for both TV viewers and radio listeners, by 11 out of the 20 participating broadcasters. Armenia, Belgium, Denmark, Estonia and Iceland all broadcast the contest in addition to the competing countries.

See also
 Eurovision Song Contest 2010
 Junior Eurovision Song Contest 2010

References

External links 
 

Eurovision Young Musicians by year
2010 in music
2010 in Austria
Music festivals in Austria
Events in Vienna
May 2010 events in Europe